The Washington County Courthouse is a historic courthouse located at Salem, Washington County, Indiana. It was designed by Harry P. McDonald and his brother, both of Louisville, and built in 1886.  It is a Richardsonian Romanesque building and faced with limestone from the area was used in the construction. It is two-stories above a raised basement and features a five-story corner clock tower with a conical roof. It is the third courthouse at that location.

It was listed on the National Register of Historic Places in 1980.  It is located within the Salem Downtown Historic District.

References

Courthouses on the National Register of Historic Places in Indiana
Government buildings completed in 1886
County courthouses in Indiana
Richardsonian Romanesque architecture in Indiana
Clock towers in Indiana
1886 establishments in Indiana
Individually listed contributing properties to historic districts on the National Register in Indiana
Buildings and structures in Washington County, Indiana
National Register of Historic Places in Washington County, Indiana